L'amore è una cosa semplice is the fifth studio album by Italian pop singer-songwriter Tiziano Ferro. The album was released in Europe on 28 November 2011 and it was preceded by the single "La differenza tra me e te", released on 14 October 2011.

The album includes a song entirely written by Irene Grandi, a cover of the single "La fine" by Italian rapper Nesli and a duet with American R&B singer John Legend.

The Spanish-language version of the album, titled El amor es una cosa simple, was released in March 2012. It includes songs adapted by Mexican songwriter Mónica Velez and Spanish singer Pablo Alborán.

Singles
 The first single from the album, "La differenza tra me e te", was released in Italy on 14 October 2011. The music video for the song, directed by Gaetano Morbioli, was released through Ferro's official Vevo channel on YouTube on 27 October 2011. The single peaked at number three on the Wallonia Ultratop 50 and it spent six consecutive weeks at number two on the Italian Singles Chart, being certified double platinum by the Federation of the Italian Music Industry for domestic downloads exceeding 60,000 units. The Spanish-language version of the song, "La diferencia entre tú y yo", was released as a digital download single on 16 January 2012.
 On 6 January 2012, the track "L'ultima notte al mondo" was released in Italy as the second single from the album. The music video for the song, directed by Gaetano Morbioli, was shot in Seefeld, Austria, and it was released in February 2012. The single peaked at number five on the Italian Singles Chart, and it was certified platinum by the Federation of the Italian Music Industry. The Spanish-language version of the song, "La última noche del mundo", was released as the second single from the album in early March 2012.
 The third single from the album, "Hai delle isole negli occhi", was released in Italy on 30 March 2012. The music video for the song, directed by Fabio Jansen and filmed in Milan, was released in April 2012.
 The song "Liebe ist einfach/L'amore è una cosa semplice", a half German-language version of the title track, was recorded as a duet with Cassandra Steen and released as a single in Germany on 13 April 2012. It was the first single from the album released in Germany. The original Italian-language version of the song was later released as a single in Italy and managed to debut and peak at number 9 on the Italian Singles Chart.

Track listing

L'amore è una cosa semplice

El amor es una cosa simple

Charts and certifications

Peak positions

Year-end charts

Certifications

Release history

Notes

Tiziano Ferro albums
2011 albums
Italian-language albums
Spanish-language albums
Capitol Records albums
Albums produced by Michele Canova